Casiokids are a Norwegian synthpop ensemble from Bergen, and Stavanger formed in 2005. The band consists of Ketil Kinden Endresen, Fredrik Øgreid Vogsborg, Omar Johnsen and Kjetil Bjøreid Aabø. Associated musicians are Joachim Amundsen Trana, Eirik Utne, Einar Olsson, Geir Svensson and Snorre Sturla Lyngstad. They are signed with Universal Records in Norway, Polyvinyl Records in North America, Flake Records in Japan, Pop Frenzy in Australia and Moshi Moshi Records for the rest of the world.

After releasing the single "Grønt lys i alle ledd / Togens hule" in the United Kingdom, the band was described by NME as "the best thing to come out of Norway since black metal." The band has been compared to fellow Norwegian artists The Whitest Boy Alive, Röyksopp, and Annie. They have released an album named Topp Stemning På Lokal Bar that includes the song "Fot i hose", which was included in the comedy series Friday Night Dinner (as transitional music) and on the soundtrack for the football video game FIFA 10, and listed by the NME as the fourth best new song of the week. They are currently managed by Christopher Wareing.

In the summer of 2010 legendary Norwegian pop band a-ha gave away four separate prizes of one million kroner each to Norwegian artists who they felt had the most export potential at that time. Casiokids was one of the recipients along with Susanne Sundfør, Moddi and Shining.

In October 2011 the band released their new album Aabenbaringen over Aaskammen in North America, Norway and Japan, with a worldwide release scheduled for January 2012. In November 2011 Casiokids visited Japan for the first time.

Discography
Fuck MIDI (2007)
Topp Stemning På Lokal Bar (2010)
Aabenbaringen over aaskammen (2011)

References

External links
www.casiokids.com
Video session for 'They Shoot Music - Don't They'

Synthpop groups
Norwegian electronic music groups
Norwegian pop music groups
Neo-psychedelia groups
Musical groups established in 2005
2005 establishments in Norway
Musical groups from Bergen